Mary Ware may refer to:
 Mary Ware (politician), member of the Kansas Senate
 Mary Ware (writer), American poet and prose writer
 Mary Lee Ware, American philanthropist